Norwich Writers' Circle was established in 1943 in Norwich, England, by local group of writers. Its aim is to promote the craft of writing and to create a fellowship amongst writers, locally and nationally.

The group holds meetings twice a month throughout the year, many of which feature visiting writers who set in-house competitions.

Past group members include award-winning biographer D. J. Taylor.

External links 
 Group history
 norwichwriters.org.uk
 norwichwriters.blogspot.com

Organisations based in Norwich
Writing circles
Culture in Norwich
British writers' organisations
1943 establishments in England